IDSA may stand for:

Identity School of Acting
Industrial Designers Society of America
Infectious Diseases Society of America
Interactive Digital Software Association, former name of the Entertainment Software Association
Institute for Defence Studies and Analyses
International Dark-Sky Association (whose formal acronym is actually IDA)
International Diving Schools Association
Manohar Parrikar Institute for Defence Studies and Analyses (MP-IDSA)